Club Basket Tartessos, more commonly referred to today by its sponsorship name of Canasta Unibasket Jerez, is a professional Basketball team based in Jerez de la Frontera, Andalusia. The team was dissolved in 2010 due to financial problems.

Season by season

External links
Official website

Defunct basketball teams in Spain
Basketball teams in Andalusia
Basketball teams established in 1993
Basketball teams disestablished in 2010
Sport in Jerez de la Frontera